Lieutenant-Commander John Skinner Wilson (10 March 1884 – 31 May 1916) was a Trinidad-born rugby player, who represented , United Services RFC and London Scottish FC. He enrolled in the Royal Navy in 1898. He was killed in World War I in the Battle of Jutland, serving as Lieutenant-Commander aboard . He is remembered on panel 10 at the Plymouth Naval Memorial.

Early life
John Skinner Wilson was born on 10 March 1884 to Colonel Sir David Wilson  and Nora Kate in Trinidad, where his father was subintendant of Crown Lands. From 1897 to 1904, his father was Governor and Commander in Chief of British Honduras. John had two brothers: the elder, Major Harry Stuart Wilson (born 1883), passed out of Sandhurst in 1902, and was killed in action on 9 September 1916 on the Western Front serving as Commanding Officer with the Royal Munster Fusiliers; his younger brother, Eric Ronald Wilson, survived the War as a captain in the Black Watch, and earned the Military Cross.

Wilson signed up as a navy officer cadet at Britannia Royal Naval College on 15 September 1898, and on 14 January 1900 was gazetted midshipman aboard , on which he served for three years. On 12 July 1904, he was promoted to sub-lieutenant, with seniority backdated to 10 March 1903; and on 5 January 1905, to lieutenant, backdated to 10 March 1904. He served in the submarines for six months, before joining , the flagship of Sir Arthur May.

Rugby career
Wilson was a forward with a reputation for keeping busy and remaining close to the action. He played for United Services RFC, and was captain of the team in 1908 and 1909, considered to be his best years of rugby, according to E. H. D. Sewell. He was selected a second time for Scotland, to play against  at Inverleith on 6 February 1909. Ahead of the game, the Welsh were 'quietly confident' of beating the home side. Wilson also played for the Navy against the Army 1907–1908 and again in 1913.

Off the rugby field, he was also a good oarsman and sailor.

International appearances

First World War
Wilson served aboard HMS Indefatigable from 1913. Only two survivors were rescued by the German torpedo boat S.68.

Wilson is commemorated on the Plymouth Naval Memorial, and, alongside his brother Harry, on the Chandler's Ford War Memorial.

See also
 List of international rugby union players killed in action during the First World War

References

Bibliography
 Bath, Richard (ed.) The Scotland Rugby Miscellany (Vision Sports Publishing Ltd, 2007 )

External links
 
 

1884 births
1916 deaths
Scottish rugby union players
Scotland international rugby union players
British military personnel killed in World War I
Royal Navy officers of World War I
United Services players
Rugby union forwards
British people in the British West Indies